Mira Johanna Kunnasluoto born (13 January 1974 in Elimäki, Finland) is a Finnish singer. She first came to fame as a tango singer; now her repertoire includes evergreens and Finnish pop.

Biography 
She is the second youngest of four sisters. Her parents divorced when she was only 3. Young, she played guitar and sung at home. Arja Koriseva and Eija Kantola were her favorite Finnish singers, and Kim Wilde, Paul Young, and Madonna her favorite international singers.

After leaving school, she attended Kuusankoski nursing college, but dropped out after six months. She started catering college but also dropped out. She trained briefly as a florist, abandoned it after four months, and started to participate in singing competitions. In 1999 she took part in the Radio Stars competition, the Stage Stars, and the Finland Stars. Modest success in these encouraged her to try for the prestigious Tangomarkkinat.

She became Tango Queen in 2000, since when she has been a respected and popular singer in Finland. A high point in her career was a tour to the US and Canada with Eino Grön.

She then joined the Pentecostal gospel.

Personal life 
She married at the age of 18 and had two children, Lassi and Janne, but the marriage did not last.

Discography

 2000: Mira Kunnasluoto
 2005: Riisuttu
 2015: Näytä värisi
 2015: Jouluyö
 2017: Sinuun kun turvaan

Awards
 2000 Tango Queen

References

Sources
 Marja Nyman, Tangokuninkaalliset, Revontuli 2002, 
 Tony Latva and Petri Tuunainen, Iskelmän tähtitaivas, WSOY 2004,

External links
 Official website

1974 births
Living people
21st-century Finnish women singers
Finnish tango musicians